Frank Schäffer (born July 6, 1952) is a retired German football player. He spent 9 seasons in the Bundesliga with Borussia Mönchengladbach.

Honours
 European Cup finalist: 1977.
 UEFA Cup winner: 1975, 1979.
 UEFA Cup finalist: 1980.
 Bundesliga champion: 1975, 1976, 1977.
 Bundesliga runner-up: 1978.

External links
 

1952 births
Living people
German footballers
Borussia Mönchengladbach players
Bundesliga players
SpVgg Ludwigsburg players
UEFA Cup winning players
Association football defenders
People from Böblingen (district)
Sportspeople from Stuttgart (region)
Footballers from Baden-Württemberg
West German footballers